Nicodemus Eng'walas Okille is an Anglican archbishop in Uganda

Okille was educated at Uganda Christian University, and was ordained in 1973. He served in the Diocese of Bukedi. He was bishop of Bukedi from 1984 to 2012.

References

20th-century Anglican bishops in Uganda
21st-century Anglican bishops in Uganda
Uganda Christian University alumni
Anglican bishops of Bukedi
Living people
Year of birth missing (living people)